Ghulam Mohiuddin Shabnam (1935–2009), was a prominent Afghan painter, song composer, and educator. He was one of the most famous figures of cubism and abstract art in Afghanistan.

Life 
He is considered one of the painters of the second golden age of Realism in Afghanistan, along with Karim Shah Khan, Abdul Ghafoor Breshna, Hafiz Pakzad, Mohammad Maimanagi and Akbar Khorasani.

Shabnam was a collaborator and artistic consultant of the United Nations Education, Culture and Awareness Department (UNESCO). In the 1960s, he became famous for composing songs in Farsi, Pashto and Balochi languages, which were played on the radio.

References 

Afghan painters
1935 births
2009 deaths
20th-century Afghan educators